Broye-Aubigney-Montseugny is a commune in the Haute-Saône department in the region of Bourgogne-Franche-Comté in eastern France.

The town was formed by the merger of Broye-lès-Pesmes, Aubigney, and Montseugny in 1972.

Broye-lès-Pesmes has been proposed as the location of Amagetobria, a major settlement of the Sequani tribe in the pre-Roman and Roman era. Up to the 19th century, the town was called Moigte-de-Broie, which was derived from its ancient name.

Gallery

See also
Communes of the Haute-Saône department

References

Communes of Haute-Saône
Sequani